Schlager is a surname. Notable people with the surname include:

Alexander Schlager (born 1996), Austrian footballer
Hansjörg Schlager (1948–2004), German alpine skier
Werner Schlager (born 1972), Austrian table tennis player
Xaver Schlager (born 1997), Austrian footballer

See also
Schläger
Schaller (surname)